Bina Maya Theeng Lama (born 26 August 1980), professionally known as Bina Theeng Tamang, is a Nepalese educator, writer, and poet from Kathmandu, Nepal. She is best known for her short stories and poems.

Early life and education
Tamang was born on 26 August 1980 in Hetauda city of Makwanpur district in Nepal. Tamang did her schooling in Makwanpur from Shree Pragati Secondary School. She completed her graduation in Education from Kathmandu Shiksha Campus (affiliated to Tribhuvan University).

Literary Career 
In 2013, Chhuki, a collection of her short stories was published by Sabdahar Creation Inc. In 2015, Rato Ghar, a collection of her poems was published by Biswo Nepali Sahitya Inc. Her anthology of poetry Rato Ghar was awarded the 2016 Sulav Tamang Wangmaya Puraskar, award by the Sulav Tamang Prativa Pratisthan. On 26 August 2020, she published her second short story collection titled Yambunera.

She is a pioneer poet advocating, in her poems, the voices of marginalized Janajatis, Madhesis and other minor groups those were suppressed during autocracy of Shah and Rana Regimes. She currently works as a teacher in Jaya Bhadrakali Basic School, of which she also serves as the Vice Principal.

Published works
Tamang has published a poetry collection and two short story collections.

 Chhuki – Short story collection, published in 2013 (2069 BS)
 Rato Ghar – Poetry collection, published in 2015 (2072 BS)
 Yambunera – Short story collection, published on 26 August 2020

Literary Awards
Literary awards received by Tamang:

National Poem Competition
First Prize (Organized by Shakti FM 103.4 Meghaherz, Hetauda) in 2070 BS (2013 CE)
International Poem Competition
Third Prize (Organized by The White Zone Nepal), 2069 BS (2012 CE)
National Dishhome Barhakhari Story Competition
First Prize (Organized by Baarakhari Books), 2076 BS (2019 CE)

References

1980 births
Living people
Nepalese writers
Nepalese educators
People from Hetauda
Tribhuvan University alumni
21st-century Nepalese educators
Tamang-language poets from Nepal
Tamang people
Nepalese women poets